A fashion entrepreneur is a person who has possession of a fashion enterprise, venture or idea, and assumes significant accountability for the inherent risks and outcome.

Definition
Originating from the phrase entrepreneur, a fashion entrepreneur is someone whose primary activities work within the fashion industry.
For example, a fashion designer who uses entrepreneurial principles to organize, create, and manage ventures within related and connected areas of the fashion industry. Fashion ventures include guide books for fashion designers

Current Practice 

Fashion entrepreneurs focus on creating networks within the fashion industry and inter-connected projects with varying aims including education, profitability, and profile-building. Some fashion entrepreneurs work to provide a network of knowledge share platforms, other work to address social and structural issues goals.

Core business practices for fashion entrepreneurs focus on topics such as creativity and innovation, writing  business plans, raising finance, sales and marketing, and the small business management skills needed to run a creative company. Fashion entrepreneurs seek to deliver fashion business expertise in retail, manufacturing, money and marketing.  The 21st century has seen the proliferation of organizations and award ceremonies promoting, inspiring and challenging online entrepreneurship by highlighting the enterprising attributes, creativity, innovation and the success of today's entrepreneurs.

References 

Entrepreneurship
Fashion